PositiveSingles is a free friendship, social, and dating website that specifically caters to people who are living with sexually transmitted diseases (STD). Its services are mainly provided in North America and Europe. PositiveSingles was founded in 2001 and its headquarters are in Vaughan, Ontario. The company is privately held.

References 

Companies based in Vaughan
Online dating services of Canada
HIV/AIDS
Sexual health

Further reading
 Chris Corsen Ontario